Demetrios Lialios (Δημήτριος Λιάλιος, Patras, 1869 - 13 March 1940) was a Greek composer. He studied at the Hochschule für Musik und Theater München under Ludwig Thuille. He was possibly the first modern Greek composer to write chamber music. His oeuvre includes an opera, a requiem, 22 orchestral compositions, 14 chamber music works, and 2 compositions for Greek Orthodox liturgy. His Requiem in B minor, titled Missa pro Defunctis is perhaps the first large-scale modern Greek choral work. He also composed lieder in various languages. Between 1919 and 1935 he was vice-consul of Greece in Munich.

References

1869 births
1940 deaths
19th-century classical composers
19th-century male musicians
20th-century classical composers
20th-century male musicians
Greek classical composers
Male classical composers
Romantic composers
University of Music and Performing Arts Munich alumni
19th-century Greek musicians
20th-century Greek musicians
Musicians from Patras